Henry Pelham (1694–1754) was Prime Minister of Great Britain.

Henry Pelham may also refer to:

 Henry Pelham (Speaker), Speaker of the House of Commons
 Henry Pelham (Clerk of the Pells) (1661–1721), Member of Parliament for Seaford and Lewes
 Henry Pelham (of Stanmer) (c. 1694–1725), Member of Parliament for Hastings and Lewes
 Henry Pelham (engraver) (1748/9–1806), American Loyalist and artist
 Henry Pelham (British Army officer) (1759–1797), 3rd Foot Guards officer and Member of Parliament for Lewes
 Henry Pelham, 3rd Earl of Chichester (1804–1886), English nobleman
 Henry Pelham (rower) (1908–1978), Canadian rower 
 Henry Cressett Pelham (c. 1729–1803), Member of Parliament for Bramber and Tiverton
 Henry Francis Pelham (1846–1907), English scholar and historian
 Henry Pelham (civil servant) (1876–1949), British civil servant

See also
 Henry Pelham-Clinton (disambiguation)